Mephisto was the name given to a chess-playing "pseudo-automaton" built in 1876. Unlike The Turk and Ajeeb it had no hidden operator, instead being remotely controlled by electromechanical means.

Constructed by Charles Godfrey Gumpel (c.1835 - 1921), an Alsatian manufacturer of artificial limbs, it took some 6 or 7 years to build and was first shown in 1878 at Gumpel's home in Leicester Square, London. Mephisto was mainly operated by chess master Isidor Gunsberg.

Description
Mephisto consisted of a life-size figure of an elegant devil, with one foot rendered as a cloven hoof, dressed in red velvet and seated in an armchair in front of an unenclosed, open-sided table.  This table set-up was provided to reassure the player that there were no compartments beneath the board where a man could be hidden (as in "The Turk").  In addition, the public was invited to inspect the contraption before each exhibition, with the intention of demonstrating that there was no player inside. The chessboard was noted as having had indentations on each square that held the bases of the chessmen to prevent them from moving unintentionally. The figure of Mephisto itself was bolted to the table at the chest to enable its arm full reach across the board.

History
It was the first automaton to win a Chess tournament when it was entered in the Counties Chess Association in London in 1878 and at one time had its own chess club. In 1879 Mephisto, with Gunsberg, went on tour, defeating every male player. When playing ladies, however, Mephisto would first obtain a winning position before losing the game then courteously offer to shake their hand afterwards.

When Mephisto was shown at the Paris Exposition of 1889 it was operated by Jean Taubenhaus. After 1889 it was dismantled and its subsequent whereabouts are unknown.

Mephisto was later used as the name of a top-line dedicated chess computer which won the World Microcomputer Chess Championship in the years 1985-1990. The name is now used by the consumer electronics company Saitek on its line of standalone chess computers.

See also
 The Turk hoax of 1769 to 1854, destroyed in fire
 Ajeeb hoax of 1868 to 1929, destroyed in fire
 El Ajedrecista of 1912, a electromechanical machine with true integrated automation, that is extant

Notes

References

Chess automatons
1876 in chess
Hoaxes in science
19th-century hoaxes
19th-century robots